Sahapur is a census town in Panchla CD Block of Howrah Sadar subdivision in Howrah district in the Indian state of West Bengal.

Geography
It has an average elevation of 6 metres (19 feet).
Sahapur is also a small village at bankura district of west Bengal under onda police station and shantore panchyat.

Demographics
As per 2011 Census of India Shahpur had a total population of 9,022 of which 4,675 (52%) were males and 4,347 (48%) were females. Population below 6 years was 3,528. The total number of literates in Shahpur was 6,247 (78.96% of the population over 6 years).

 India census, Sahapur had a population of 7,533. Males constitute 51% of the population and females 49%. Sahapur has an average literacy rate of 66%, higher than the national average of 59.5%: male literacy is 72%, and female literacy is 60%. In Sahapur, 14% of the population is under 6 years of age.

References

Cities and towns in Howrah district